Harley Kemp (born 9 July 1994) is an Australian professional darts player. He won the Australian Masters in 2013 and qualified for the 2014 BDO World Darts Championship.

Career 
In 2013, Harley won the Australian Masters and the Central Coast Australian Classic. He qualified for the 2014 BDO World Darts Championship he played Michael Meaney in the preliminary round and lost 3–0. He played Darryl Fitton at the 2014 BDO World Trophy, he lost 5–6 in legs.

Harley quit of the PDC in April 2021.

World Championship results

BDO 
 2014: Preliminary round (lost to Michael Meaney 0–3) (sets)

External links

References 

1994 births
Living people
Australian darts players
British Darts Organisation players
Sportsmen from Victoria (Australia)
Sportspeople from Melbourne
People from Werribee, Victoria